Taš may refer to:
Tašmajdan Park
Tašmajdan Sports and Recreation Center

See also
Tash (disambiguation)